Adnan Yıldırım (1957 – 2 June 1994) was a Turkish businessman of Kurdish descent.

Yıldırım was born in Diyarbakır, the son of Selim Yıldırım.

On 3 June 1994 together with Savaş Buldan and Hacı Karay, he was abducted by unidentified armed persons from the Çınar Hotel in Yeşilyurt, İstanbul. The abducted persons were found dead on 4 June 1994, on the road of Yukarıkaraş village of Yığılca District, Bolu Province.

See also
List of kidnappings

References

External links
(contains the Susurluk reports, and material on the Counter-Guerrilla)

1957 births
1990s missing person cases
1994 deaths
Formerly missing people
Kidnapped businesspeople
Male murder victims
Missing person cases in Turkey
People from Diyarbakır
Susurluk scandal
Unsolved murders in Turkey
1994 murders in Turkey